A Higher Place is the debut studio album by American progressive metalcore band Born of Osiris. It was released through Sumerian Records on July 7, 2009. A Higher Place debuted at number 73 on the Billboard 200, selling over 6,000 copies. It was the first album to have any creative input outside of the band's mastermind and drummer, Cameron Losch. Up until this point, he had written and recorded everything short of vocals on every song. Though this is mostly true for A Higher Place as well, "Exist" was written and recorded by Lee Mckinney. An earlier instrumental version of this song can be found under the title "Glass Bluntz". Though the two versions are quite different, they share the same hook that "Exist" is mostly noted for.

In September 2009, the band announced a new single, "Now Arise", and released the music video for it on the same day.

Track listing

Notes
 Track 1 is a continuation of "The Takeover" from The New Reign EP.

Personnel
Born of Osiris
 Ronnie Canizaro – lead vocals
 Lee McKinney – lead guitar
 David Darocha – bass
 Joe Buras – keyboards, backing vocals 
 Cameron Losch – drums, rhythm guitar, bass

Production and recording
Chris "Zeuss" Harris – production
Ash Avildsen – executive production
Shawn Keith – executive production
Chris Dowhan – mastering, mixing
Andreas Lars Magnusson – mastering, mixing
Mike Rashmawi – vocal recording

Charts

References

2009 debut albums
Sumerian Records albums
Born of Osiris albums
Albums produced by Chris "Zeuss" Harris